Cecharismena nectarea is a species of moth in the family Erebidae. It is found in North America.

The MONA or Hodges number for Cecharismena nectarea is 8532.

References

Further reading

 
 
 

Boletobiinae
Articles created by Qbugbot
Moths described in 1890